Nasiru Sule Garo (born 28 January 1974) is a member of the House of Representatives of the Federal Republic of Nigeria.

Early life
Nasiru Sule Garo was born in Garo Town Kabo local government of Kano State, Nigeria on 28 January 1974. He attended Garo Central primary school, junior secondary school garo, and Bagauda Technical College before proceeding to Bayero University Kano where he obtain a Diploma in mass communication, Advance Diploma information management and B-Sc in political science. Nasiru is married to Fatima L Sule and they are blessed with children

Career
Nasiru worked with Garo Tannery and Trends Venerate ltd, all in Kano, He also served as special assistant to the Executive Governor of Kano State from 2002 to 2003. He was elected to the house of representative on the platform of People's Democratic Party (Nigeria) (PDP). Nasiru was elected into the House of Representatives in 2011 on the PDP platform and also in 2015 on the platform of APC (All People's  Congress).

References

1974 births
Living people
Peoples Democratic Party members of the House of Representatives (Nigeria)
Members of the House of Representatives (Nigeria)